Marin Bakalov (born 18 April 1962) is a Bulgarian football coach and former professional player.

Career

Playing career
Bakalov made a total of 454 league appearances in Bulgaria for Botev Plovdiv, CSKA Sofia, Spartak Plovdiv, Maritsa Plovdiv and Olimpik Galata. He also played in Portugal for Chaves.

Management career
Bakalov has managed Botev Plovdiv, Chernomorets Burgas, Botev 2002, and Spartak Plovdiv.

References

1962 births
Living people
Bulgarian footballers
Botev Plovdiv players
PFC CSKA Sofia players
G.D. Chaves players
FC Spartak Plovdiv players
FC Maritsa Plovdiv players
First Professional Football League (Bulgaria) players
Bulgarian football managers
Botev Plovdiv managers
Bulgarian expatriates in Portugal
Association football defenders
People from Asenovgrad